Viktor Vladimirovich Solovyov (born 23 April 1957) is a retired Russian sailor. He competed in the mixed two-person keelboat (Star class) at the 1988 and 1996 Olympics and placed 8th and 17th, respectively.

References

1957 births
Living people
Russian male sailors (sport)
Soviet male sailors (sport)
Sailors at the 1988 Summer Olympics – Star
Sailors at the 1996 Summer Olympics – Star
Olympic sailors of the Soviet Union
Olympic sailors of Russia